Billings Central Catholic High School is a private, Roman Catholic high school in Billings, Montana, United States.  It is one of three Catholic high schools in the Roman Catholic Diocese of Great Falls-Billings.

Background
Billings Central Catholic opened in 1944 with its first class graduating in 1948.  It was the first diocesan Catholic high school in the Diocese of Great Falls in eastern Montana.  A new building was completed in 1947 and "Billings Central Catholic"  has been located there since. In 1987, Billings Central Catholic joined the parish schools at Holy Rosary, Little Flower, St. Pius and St. Patrick's to consolidate into one Catholic school system in Billings known as Billings Catholic Schools.

Montana High School Association State Championships
 Boys Basketball – 1996, 2019, 2021
 Boys Cross Country - 2002
 Boys Football - 1956, 1968, 2007, 2012, 2018
 Boys Golf - 1971, 1973, 1978, 1993, 1994, 2003, 2015
 Boys Soccer - 2009
 Boys Swimming - 2004, 2005, 2006, 2010, 2011, 2012, 2013, 2014, 2015, 2016, 2017, 2018, 2019, 2021, 2022, 2023
 Boys Tennis - 2007, 2009, 2013, 2014, 2015, 2016, 2017, 2022
 Boys Track and Field - 1999
 Boys Wrestling - 1965
 Drama - 2011
 Girls Basketball - 1985, 1986, 1987, 1990, 2010, 2012, 2020
 Girls Cross Country
 Girls Golf - 1977, 1978, 1983, 1984, 1985, 1992, 2003, 2008, 2009, 2010
 Girls Gymnastics - 5 titles from 1975–1983
 Girls Soccer - 2008, 2009, 2010, 2011, 2012, 2013, 2015, 2016, 2018, 2022
 Girls Softball - 1994, 1995
 Girls Swimming - 1997, 1998, 1999, 2010, 2011, 2012, 2013, 2014, 2015, 2018, 2020, 2021, 2022, 2023
 Girls Volleyball - 1987, 1988, 2009, 2017, 2018, 2020, 2021, 2022
 Girls Tennis - 2017, 2022
 Girls Track and Field - 1993, 1994, 1995
 Speech and Debate - 2004
 Science Olympiad - 2012

Notes and references

Roman Catholic Diocese of Great Falls–Billings
Buildings and structures in Billings, Montana
Catholic secondary schools in Montana
Catholic schools in Montana
Educational institutions established in 1944
Schools accredited by the Northwest Accreditation Commission
Schools in Yellowstone County, Montana
1944 establishments in Montana